Walusimbi Solomon  (born 19 September 1999) is a Ugandan footballer who plays as a striker for Maroons FC in Uganda Premier League.

Club

Maroons FC
Walusimbi made his debut for Maroons FC on  15 September 2016 on the opening day of the 2016-17 Big League season against Paidha Black Angels at Bar Okoro stadium in Zombo district, and the match ended in a draw of  2-2. He scored his first goal for Maroons FC on  13 October 2016 in the 82nd minute against Bright Light FC, Maroons FC won 2-0. He scored his ninth goal of the campaign in with a 4-1 victory over Sporting United in the FUFA Big League. In the 2016/17 FUFA Big League finals, Walusimbi scored the winning goal for Maroons FC hence promoted as champions to Uganda Premier League 2017-2018. He scored a total of 9 goals for Maroons FC during the Big League campaign.

On 24 October 2017, Walusimbi made his Uganda premiership debut when he came in as a substitute in the 72nd minute for William Wadri and scored in the 78th minute against Masavu FC, Maroons FC won 1-0. In his first season of Uganda Premier League he scored five goals in 24 league matches.

References

External links
sofascore.com

football-256.com
kawowo.com
kawowo.com
africa-football.com
fufa.co.ug
kawowo.com
kawowo.com
kawowo.com

1999 births
Living people
Ugandan footballers
Uganda Premier League players
Association football forwards